The 1955 Stephen F. Austin Lumberjacks football team was an American football team that represented Stephen F. Austin State University as a member of the Lone Star Conference (LSC) during the 1955 college football season. Led by Ted Jefferies in his ninth and final season as head coach, the Lumberjacks compiled an overall record of 5–4 with a mark of 2–4 in conference play, tying for fourth place in the LSC.

Schedule

References

Stephen F. Austin
Stephen F. Austin Lumberjacks football seasons
Stephen F. Austin Lumberjacks football